Nick Conway (born Nicholas Campbell on 25 December 1962) is an English actor.  He played Billy Boswell in Carla Lane's BBC comedy series Bread.  He has also appeared in Starting Out, Thank You Mrs Clinkscales, When Saturday Comes, Coronation Street, Keep On Running Mr. Salter and Juliet Bravo. 
 
He has featured in many theatre productions and currently runs a theatre school. He is also a DJ and teacher. In November 2010 he appeared on Coronation Street.

Filmography

Film

Television

References

External links

1962 births
Living people
English male television actors